The Bhumibol Bridge, also known as the Industrial Ring Road Bridge is part of the 13 km long Industrial Ring Road connecting southern Bangkok with Samut Prakan province. The bridge crosses the Chao Phraya River twice, with two striking cable-stayed spans of lengths of 702 m and 582 m supported by two diamond-shaped pylons 173 m and 164 m high. Where the two spans meet, another road rises to join them at a free-flowing interchange suspended 50 metres above the ground.

The bridge opened for traffic on 20 September 2006, before the official opening date of 5 December 2006.  It is part of the Bangkok Industrial Ring Road, a royal scheme initiated by King Bhumibol Adulyadej that aimed to solve traffic problems within Bangkok and surrounding areas, especially the industrial area around Khlong Toei Port, southern Bangkok, and Samut Prakan province.

According to tradition, all bridges over the Chao Phraya in Bangkok are named after a member of the royal family.  In October 2009, it was announced that both bridges would be named after King Bhumibol Adulyadej, with the northern bridge officially named "Bhumibol 1 Bridge" and the southern bridge "Bhumibol 2 Bridge".  The unofficial name "Mega Bridge" was also widely used.

The bridge was featured on the Discovery Channel. Even though the bridges are the fastest way to drive from Phra Pradaeng district, Samut Prakan Province to Bangkok, motorcycles were banned from using the two Bhumibol bridges from 1 November 2018 due to safety concerns.

Structure
 Bhumibol Bridge 1 is the northern bridge connecting  Yan Nawa District, Bangkok and Phra Pradaeng District. It is a cable-stayed bridge with seven lanes together with two high pillars. The structure is reinforced concrete 50 m above water level.
 Bhumibol Bridge 2 is the southern bridge. The structure is almost the same as Bhumibol Bridge 1, with seven lanes and two high pillars and built using reinforced concrete 50 m above the level of the river.

Gallery

See also 
 King Bhumibol Adulyadej

References

External links

Map
 
 

Cable-stayed bridges in Thailand
Road bridges in Bangkok
Bridges completed in 2006
Crossings of the Chao Phraya River
Yan Nawa district